David Duke (born 7 November 1978) is a Scottish former footballer who played as a midfielder or full back.

Duke was born in Inverness, Scotland. He joined Sunderland from Redby Community Association in 1997, and received a squad number in the 1999–2000 season. He was an unused substitute in a defeat by Wimbledon in that season's League Cup, but that was the closest he came to a competitive first-team appearance. He moved to Swindon Town in 2001, and went on to make more than 200 league appearances. He joined Darlington in 2005, but left the club by mutual consent in March 2007. Duke went on to play non-league football for clubs including Durham City, Consett, Sunderland RCA, Jarrow Roofing and Esh Winning.

After football, Duke went into e-commerce: , he was chief marketing officer of a Teesside-based digital agency.

References

External links

1978 births
Living people
Footballers from Inverness
Scottish footballers
Sunderland A.F.C. players
Swindon Town F.C. players
Darlington F.C. players
Durham City A.F.C. players
Consett A.F.C. players
Sunderland Ryhope Community Association F.C. players
Jarrow Roofing Boldon Community Association F.C. players
Esh Winning F.C. players
English Football League players
Northern Premier League players
Northern Football League players
Association football midfielders